Radio Ink is a radio broadcasting industry trade magazine owned by Streamline Publishing. Radio Ink serves the management community of the radio industry in the United States and in 43 countries worldwide. The focus of the bi-weekly magazine is radio management and operations challenges facing commercial radio broadcasters.

Annual lists
Each year the publication creates several annual lists, including a list of the "40 Most Powerful People in Radio" made up of a who's who of the radio industry. It also created the "Most Influential Women (MIW) in Radio" list, which was turned into a mentoring program by the women on the list who created an organization called Mentoring and Inspiring Women. Other lists include top managers, top radio programmers, top engineers, top African-American broadcasters, and others.

Publication history
The publication, originally named The Pulse of Broadcasting, was founded by broadcaster Tom Shovan and Ellek Seymour. In 1985, radio broadcaster Eric Rhoads became friendly with Shovan, and met with owner Bob Sillerman to acquire the struggling magazine. Rhoads changed the name to Radio Ink because of a class-action lawsuit by Tower Records — which was launching the national magazine Pulse! — against all publications named "Pulse". Rhoads negotiated with Tower Records founder Russ Soloman and changed the name of The Pulse of Broadcasting to Radio Ink, previously the name of a gossip column in the magazine.

Conferences
Radio Ink produces conferences for the radio industry, including the annual Radio Forecast conference held each fall at the Harvard Club in New York City which focuses on the financial state of the radio industry for the year and predictions for the coming year; the annual Hispanic Radio Conference, which focuses on the issues facing the Hispanic radio industry; the Sports Radio conference, which focuses on the sports radio industry; the Radio Ink Convergence Conference in San Jose, which focuses on digital audio, internet radio and digital technology as it relates to the radio broadcasting and internet broadcasting industry; and the annual DASH conference in Detroit, which is about audio technology on the automobile dashboard.

References

External links

Business magazines published in the United States
Biweekly magazines published in the United States
Magazines established in 1992
Professional and trade magazines
Magazines published in Florida